Sensation, an album by Anúna, was released in 2006 on the Danú label. All music featured on the disc is original, written by the Irish composer Michael McGlynn.

Track listing

 "O Ignis Spiritus" – 5.59
 "Brezairola" – 3:32
 "Sensation" – 5.03
 "Silver River" – 3:09
 "Shining Water" – 5:25
 "Lux Aeterna" – 3:40
 "The Road of Passage" – 2.20
 "Whispers of Paradise" – 4.26
 "Maid in the Moor Lay" – 1:29
 "Tenebrae IV" – 2:40
 "O Maria" – 6.08

All titles are originals, composed and arranged  by Michael McGlynn

Personnel
Michael McGlynn
Miriam Blennerhassett
Sharon Carty
Lucy Champion
Ian Curran
Monica Donlon
Elaine Donnelly
Orfhlaith Flynn
Toby Gilbert
Alice Gildea
Louise Harrison
Lynn Hilary
Patrick Hughes
Emily Jeffers
Nicola Lewis
Vincent Lynch
John McGlynn
Sinead McGoldrick
Brian Merriman
Jeremy Morgan
Simon Morgan
Rory Musgrave
Derek O'Gorman
Tríona Ó Healaí
Sarah O'Kennedy
Aengus Ó Maoláin
Garrath Patterson
Charlotte Richardson
Aideen Rickard
Ian Russell
Morgan Savage
Catrina Scullion
Marguerite Smith
Ronan Sugrue

Guest musicians
Gilles Servat – Speaker
Máire Bhreathnach – Violin
Noel Eccles – Percussion
Kenneth Edge – Saxophone
Andreja Malir – Concert Harp

Production
Brian Masterson and Michael McGlynn – Producer
Brian Masterson – Engineer
Maria Fitzgerald – Assistant Engineer
John McGlynn – Photography
Karen Dignam – Design
John McGlynn – Cover Image

Anúna albums
2006 classical albums